The fifteenth season of the Bleach anime series is known as . It is directed by Noriyuki Abe, and produced by TV Tokyo, Dentsu and Studio Pierrot. The season's twenty-six episodes are based on the Bleach manga series by Tite Kubo, but follow original storylines exclusive to the anime. In this arc, Soul Reaper Ichigo Kurosaki and his friends investigate a series of strange events in the Soul Society where numerous Soul Reapers have disappeared without a trace, with a seemingly large conspiracy at work. As this takes place, Ichigo notices that he loses his power after defeating Sōsuke Aizen. 

The season aired from April to October 2011. Aniplex collected it in six DVD volumes between February 22 and July 25, 2012. The English adaptation of the Bleach anime is licensed by Viz Media, and this season started airing on Adult Swim's Toonami programming block on October 6, 2013 and ended on April 27, 2014.
The episodes of this season  uses three pieces of theme music. The single opening theme is "BLUE" by ViViD. The first ending theme,  by fumika is used from episode 317 to 329. The second ending theme, "Haruka Kanata" by UNLIMITS is used from episodes 330 to 342.


Episode list

References
General

Specific

2011 Japanese television seasons
Season 15